Mikhail Yevgenyevich Borodko (born 12 July 1994) is a Russian football player.

Club career
He made his professional debut in the Russian Professional Football League for FC Metallurg Novokuznetsk on 3 October 2014 in a game against FC Smena Komsomolsk-na-Amure.

He made his Russian Football National League debut for FC Baikal Irkutsk on 17 August 2015 in a game against FC Yenisey Krasnoyarsk.

References

External links
 Career summary by sportbox.ru
 
 

1994 births
Sportspeople from Krasnoyarsk
Living people
Russian footballers
Russia under-21 international footballers
Association football goalkeepers
FC Yenisey Krasnoyarsk players
FC Ufa players
FC Nizhny Novgorod (2015) players
FC Baikal Irkutsk players
FC Novokuznetsk players